The 2008 Tripura Legislative Assembly election took place in a single phase on 23 February to elect the Members of the Legislative Assembly (MLA) from each of the 60 Assembly Constituencies (ACs) in Tripura, India. Counting of votes occurred on 7 March 2008; with the use of electronic voting machines (EVMs) in this election, the results were ready within the day.

The Communist Party of India (Marxist) (CPI(M))-led alliance, the Left Front, retained control of the Assembly by winning 49 seats and securing a more than a two-thirds majority. This provided the CPI(M) with a fourth consecutive governing term.

CPI(M) leader Manik Sarkar was sworn in as the Chief Minister of Tripura for the fourth time on 10 March 2008 along with 11 other cabinet Ministers.

Highlights
Election to the Tripura Legislative Assembly were held on February 23, 2008.  The election were held in a single phase for all the 60 assembly constituencies.

Participating Political Parties

No. of Constituencies

Electors

Performance of Women Candidates

Background
Except for a one term period of Congress government between 1988 and 1993, the CPI(M) was the dominant governing party in the state since 1978.

The previous elections to the 9th Tripura Legislative Assembly was held in 2003 and the term for this Assembly was set to expire on 19 March 2008. The Election Commission of India (ECI) announced fresh elections for the 10th Tripura Legislative Assembly on 14 January 2008. Of the 60 constituencies for the 2008 election, 20 were reserved for Scheduled Tribes and seven reserved for Scheduled Castes. Elections in all polling stations were held using electronic voting machines.

The CPI(M), headed by Manik Sarkar, had formed the Government in the 9th Tripura Assembly after being re-elected in 2003. The Left Front had won 41 of the 60 seats.

Campaign
A total of 313 candidates contested this election.

Election Day
Election Day (23 Feb 2008) was peaceful and passed without any incidents of violence in this state that has traditionally faced insurgency from militant outfits. Unprecedented security arrangements were in place for this election - 20,000 paramilitary personnel from the Border Security Force, Indo-Tibetan Border Police and Central Reserve Police Force supported by air surveillance.

Voter turnout across the state was over 90%, a record high for any state in India. This beat the previous record of around 86% set in Sikkim during the Assembly Elections in 2002.

Results

Constituency wise winners

References

2008 State Assembly elections in India
2008